Chen Lifu or Ch'en Li-fu (21 August 1900 – 8 February 2001) was a Chinese politician and anti-communist of the Republic of China.

Chen was born in Wuxing, Zhejiang, China (modern Huzhou). In 1925, Chen formally joined Kuomintang (KMT) in San Francisco after receiving his master's degree in mining engineering from the University of Pittsburgh. On January 9, 1926, Chiang Kai-shek hired Chen as his confidential secretary. Chen was later promoted in 1927 to head the Investigation Section of the Organization Department of the KMT. In 1938, Chen was again promoted, becoming the minister of education. Chen held this position until 1944.

Chen Lifu was the younger brother of Chen Guofu. As a result of the two brothers significant influence in the KMT government, they formed a political faction known as the CC Clique.

References

1900 births
2001 deaths
Members of the Kuomintang
Chinese anti-communists
Chinese people of World War II
Politicians from Huzhou
Republic of China politicians from Zhejiang
Taiwanese people from Zhejiang
University of Pittsburgh alumni
Chinese centenarians
Men centenarians
Taiwanese centenarians
Members of the 1st Legislative Yuan